"Stayin Out All Night" is a song by American rapper Wiz Khalifa. It features production by Dr. Luke and serves as the second promotional single off his fifth studio album Blacc Hollywood.

Music Video 
The song featured two music videos, both featuring Kahlifa and actress Tia Carrere. One version is an interactive video where the viewer decides how the titular night is spent.

Track listing 
Download digital (Remix)
Stayin Out All Night (Boys of Zummer Remix) (duet with Fall Out Boy) — 4:25

Charts

External links 
Official Music Video

References 

2014 singles
2014 songs
Wiz Khalifa songs
Atlantic Records singles
Rostrum Records singles